Eric Westmoreland (born March 11, 1977) is a former linebacker in the National Football League (NFL) who played from 2001 to 2004 for the Jacksonville Jaguars and Cleveland Browns. He was drafted in the third round of the 2001 NFL Draft.

Eric Westmoreland played his high school ball at Marion County High School in Jasper, Tennessee. He led the Warriors to three state championships as a running back/safety. Eric rushed for 2,359 yards and 40 TD's as a senior and finished with more than 6,000 yards and 85 TDs in his high school career. The Warriors racked up an impressive 56–1 record. He played college football at the University of Tennessee where he was a starting linebacker and helped the Vols win the 1998 National Championship.

References

1977 births
Living people
American football linebackers
Cleveland Browns players
Jacksonville Jaguars players
People from Jasper, Tennessee
Players of American football from Tennessee
Tennessee Volunteers football players